The 18th Independent Spirit Awards, honoring the best in independent filmmaking for 2002, were presented on March 22, 2003. The nominations were announced on December 12, 2002. It was hosted by John Waters.

Additionally, this ceremony is notable for when presenter Brittany Murphy seemingly bungled the reading of the winner for Best Debut Performance. In reference to her acting ability, legendary film critic Roger Ebert wrote:

As for Brittany Murphy, for me, it goes back to the 2003 Independent Spirit Awards [where] Murphy was assigned to present one of the awards. Her task was to read the names of the five nominees, open an envelope, and reveal the name of the winner. This she turned into an opportunity for screwball improvisational comedy, by pretending she could not follow this sequence, not even after the audience shouted instructions and the stage manager came to whisper in her ear not once but twice. There were those in the audience who were dumbfounded by her stupidity. I was dumbfounded by her brilliance.

Suspiciously, video footage of the entire ceremony is absent from online resources despite prior and subsequent ceremonies being made available in their entirety officially on Film Independent's YouTube account. However, footage of Murphy's alleged act was used for the 2021 HBO Max documentary titled What Happened, Brittany Murphy?.

Winners and nominees

Special awards

John Cassavetes Award
Personal Velocity: Three Portraits
 Charlotte Sometimes
 Dahmer
 ivans xtc.
 The Slaughter Rule

Truer Than Fiction Award
Jennifer Dworkin – Love & Diane
 Jeffrey Blitz – Spellbound
 Eugene Jarecki – The Trials of Henry Kissinger
 Mark Moskowitz – Stone Reader

Producers Award
Effie Brown – Real Women Have Curves and Stranger Inside
 Allen Bain and Jesse Scolaro – Cry Funny Happy and Manito
 Eden Wurmfeld – Fanci's Persuasion and Kissing Jessica Stein

Someone to Watch Award
Przemysław Reut – Paradox Lake
 Eric Eason – Manito
 Eitan Gorlin – The Holy Land

Films with multiple wins and nominations

Films that received multiple nominations

Films that won multiple awards

References

External links
 2002 Spirit Awards at IMDb

2002
Independent Spirit Awards